Two East Indiamen of the East India Company (EIC), have borne the name Hillsborough, named for Hillsborough:

 – launched in 1774. She made two complete voyages for the EIC; A Spanish fleet captured her in 1780. The Spanish Navy took her into service until 1794, when she was sold for breaking up.  
 – launched in 1783. She made seven voyages for the EIC before she was sold. She became a whaler and was broken up in 1804.

Ships of the British East India Company
Age of Sail merchant ships
Merchant ships of the United Kingdom
Ship names